Seferi is a surname. Notable people with the surname include:

Idriz Seferi (1847–1927), Albanian nationalist figure and guerrilla fighter
Nuri Seferi (born 1976), Albanian boxer
Sefer Seferi (born 1979), Albanian boxer
Taulant Seferi (born 1996), Albanian footballer
Valmir Seferi (born 1993), Finnish footballer

Albanian-language surnames